Patrycja Pozerska is a Polish football forward currently playing for MSV Duisburg in the German Bundesliga (women).

She is a member of the Polish national team.

Official international goals
 2005 European Championship qualification
 1 in Poland 1-5 France
 2011 World Cup qualification
 1 in Hungary 4-2 Poland
 1 in Bosnia-Herzegovina 0-4 Poland
 1 in Poland 1-0 Bosnia-Herzegovina

References

1984 births
Living people
MSV Duisburg (women) players
Polish women's footballers
Place of birth missing (living people)
Frauen-Bundesliga players
Women's association football forwards
RTP Unia Racibórz players